Martín Tomás Jerman (born 21 April 1959) is an Argentine cross-country skier. He competed at the 1976 Winter Olympics and the 1980 Winter Olympics.

His father Francisco Jerman and brothers Marcos Luis Jerman and Matías José Jerman were also Olympic cross-country skiers for Argentina.

References

External links
 
 

1959 births
Living people
Argentine male cross-country skiers
Olympic cross-country skiers of Argentina
Cross-country skiers at the 1976 Winter Olympics
Cross-country skiers at the 1980 Winter Olympics
Place of birth missing (living people)